Live: The Empire is a live recording by Pete Townshend. The music was recorded at London's Shepherd's Bush Empire on 9 November 1998 and released as a double CD on 18 September 2000 by UK company Eel Pie Recording Productions Ltd.  This concert marked Pete Townshend's return to the UK stage as a solo artist after an absence of 13 years. He was backed by musicians including John "Rabbit" Bundrick, Chucho Merchán and Peter Hope Evans, as well as freestyle rapper Hame.

Track listing
"On the Road Again"
"A Little Is Enough"
"Pinball Wizard"
"Drowned"
"Anyway, Anyhow, Anywhere"
"You Better You Bet"
"Behind Blue Eyes"
"Baby Don't You Do It"
"English Boy"
"Mary Anne with the Shaky Hand"
"Sheraton Gibson"
"Substitute"
"I Am an Animal"
"North Country Girl"
"(She's A) Sensation"
"A Friend Is a Friend"
"Now and Then"
"Let My Love Open the Door"
"Who Are You"
"The Kids Are Alright"
"Acid Queen"
"Won't Get Fooled Again"
"Magic Bus"
"I'm One"

References

2000 live albums
Pete Townshend live albums